Queen of Hearts is a country-pop song written by Hank DeVito, the pedal steel guitarist in Emmylou Harris's backing group The Hot Band, and was first recorded by Dave Edmunds on his 1979 album Repeat When Necessary.  It was released as a single and reached No. 11 in the UK and No. 12 in Ireland that year, but failed to chart substantially elsewhere in the world. The most successful version of the song was recorded by Juice Newton in 1981 – her version reached #2 in the United States and South Africa. The song also reached the top 10 in Canada, Australia, Denmark, Switzerland and New Zealand.

Juice Newton version

Following an appearance on the 1980 Rodney Crowell album But What Will the Neighbors Think, on which composer DeVito played guitar, "Queen of Hearts" had its highest-profile rendition in a version by country-rock singer Juice Newton from the 1981 album Juice. Newton would later recall: "I did ['Queen of Hearts'] live for about a year...Then I brought it to [producer] Richard Landis when we started the Juice album. He wasn’t convinced at that point that it was a breakout song but I told him I think this is a real cool song … so we cut it." Newton's own favorite cut on the Juice album, "Queen of Hearts" was issued as the album's second single and would reach No. 2 on the Billboard Hot 100 for two weeks in September 1981, behind "Endless Love" by Diana Ross and Lionel Richie. While still at No. 2, "Queen of Hearts" was certified Gold for domestic sales of one million units.

"Queen of Hearts" also gave Newton her second huge international hit, with Top Ten chart positions in Australia, Canada, New Zealand, South Africa, and Switzerland, and more moderate success in Austria, Germany, and the Netherlands. Her recording of the song earned Newton a 1982 Grammy nomination for Best Female Vocalist, Country and Western category, "Queen of Hearts" having been a No. 14 country hit. In June 2014, Newton's version of the song was ranked No. 92 by Rolling Stone on its list of the 100 greatest country songs of all time.

Newton re-recorded "Queen of Hearts" for her 1998 album The Trouble With Angels.  In 1997, a live version by Dave Edmunds was released on his compilation album Rockin' .

Juice Newton's first version of the song is featured in Oliver Stone's 1986 film Salvador and the 1997 film Boogie Nights. It also appears as source music in the first episode of The Americans, a 2013 television series set during the first Reagan administration. The song is also featured in the 1998 King of the Hill episode Hank's Dirty Laundry, the 2017 South Park episode "Splatty Tomato" and the 2004 video game Grand Theft Auto: San Andreas.

Chart performance (Juice Newton version)

Weekly charts

Year-end charts

Covers
In 1982, Austrian artist Nickerbocker (de) released the German rendering "Puppe (du bist a moderne Hex')" ("Doll (You're A Modern Witch)") which reached #3 in Austria.(source in German)

References

External links
 
 

1981 singles
2006 singles
Juice Newton songs
Dave Edmunds songs
Song recordings produced by Richard Landis
Capitol Records singles
Swan Song Records singles
Rodney Crowell songs
1979 songs
Songs written by Hank DeVito